Avram Mrazović (Serbian: Аврам Мразовић; Sombor, Habsburg monarchy, 12 March 1756 – Sombor, 20 February 1826) was a Serbian writer, translator, pedagogue, aristocrat and Senator of the Free Royal City of Sombor, part of the Military Frontier of the Austrian Empire. He was the first to institutionalize a modern teacher training program in 1778 which eventually became a teachers' college in Sombor.

Biography
Avram Mrazović was the son of Reverend and Mr. Georgije Mrazović, parish priest of the Serbian Orthodox Church of Saint John the Baptist in Sombor. Mrazović is known in literary annals as a Serbian education reformer who lived and worked in the Habsburg Empire in Serb and Romanian territories of today's Serbian Vojvodina and Romanian Banat at the same time as Teodor Janković Mirijevski and Stefan Vujanovski. He is the first director of the Serb National Primary School Commission after being named to the post by his mentor, Teodor Janković-Mirijevski. He also founded Norma (Normal school), a teacher training college in Sombor in 1778 before another school was opened in 1812 in Szentendre called Regium Pedagogium Nationis Illiricae (Preparandium in Latin or Preparadija in Serbian) which eventually was relocated back to Sombor in 1816. Mrazović wrote and published Rukovodstvo k slavenstej grammatice: vo upotreblenik slaveno-serbskih narodnyh ucilisc (a Serbian grammar with correct syntax) in Vienna in 1794 for Serbian schools. He credited Meletius Smotrytsky's 1619 work as his inspiration.

The first book on logic in the Serbian language was written by Nikola Šimić, Avram Mrazović's friend, and was published in Budapest in two volumes, entitled "Logic"  (Vol. I, 1808; Vol. II, 1809). Ten years later, Mrazović wrote the second book on logic in Serbian in a similar manner, entitled "Logic, or Reasoning", completed in 1826, the year he died. The book was not published.

Aside from Pavle Julinac, remembered as the first to translate from French, other translators of the period were Gligorije Trlajić, Nikola Lazarević, Atanasije Stojković, and Avram Mrazović. Mrazović translated the French work of Jeanne-Marie Leprince de Beaumont,  and the Latin of Ovid, Cicero, Virgil, Horace, and the Greek of Aristotle.

Works

 Rukovodstvo k slavenstej grammatice: vo upotreblenik slaveno-serbskih narodnyh ucilisc (1794)
 Celovekomerzosti I raskajaniju (1808)
 Epistolarum de Ponto livri V (Buda, 1818)
 Rukovodstvo k slavenskomu krasnoreciju vo upotreblenik ljubiteleij slavenskago jezyka izdano Avraamom ot Mrazovic (1821)
 Logic, or Reasoning, completed in 1826, but the book was never published.

See also
 Dositej Obradović
 Teodor Janković Mirijevski
 Atanasije Dimitrijević Sekereš 
 Stefan Vujanovski
 Uroš Nestorović
 Dimitrie Eustatievici
 Djordje Natošević

References

Serbian writers
Serbian translators
1756 births
1826 deaths
Translators of Virgil